Valentina Vargas (born December 31, 1964) is a Chilean actress. She has developed most of her career in France.

Biography
Vargas began her career in the dramatic art within the workshop of Tania Balaschova in Paris and later at the Yves Pignot School in Los Angeles. Her cinematographic career started with the filming of three interesting works in contemporary French cinema, namely Pierre Jolivet's Strictly Personal, Luc Besson's Big Blue and Jean-Jacques Annaud's The Name of the Rose. Over the years, Vargas also worked with Samuel Fuller in Street of No Return (1989), Miguel Littín in Los náufragos (1994) and Alfredo Arieta in Fuegos.

Vargas is trilingual in Spanish, French and English. This has enabled her to star in films as varied as the cinematic horror film Hellraiser: Bloodline where she played the Cenobite Angelique, to the comedy Chili con carne of Thomas Gilou. She appeared opposite Jan Michael Vincent (Dirty Games), Malcolm McDowell and Michael Ironside (Southern Cross), and James Remar (The Tigress).

After her performance in Bloody Mallory, where she played "the malicious one", she turned to playing roles for television. Initially she played in a TV miniseries version of Les Liaisons dangereuses directed by Josée Dayan. She starred in this production with Catherine Deneuve, Rupert Everett, Leelee Sobieski and Nastassja Kinski.

Filmography
Strictement personnel (1985) - La masseuse
The Name of the Rose (1986) - The Girl
Fuegos (1987) - Margarita
The Big Blue (1988) - Bonita
Dirty Games (1989) - Nicola Kendra
Street of No Return (1989) - Celia
The Tigress (1992) - Tigress / Pauline
The Devil's Breath (1993)
Twin Sitters (1994) - Lolita
The Shipwrecked (1994) - Isol
Hellraiser: Bloodline (1996) - Peasant Girl / Angelique / Angelique Cenobite
Southern Cross (1999) - Mariana Flores
Chili con carne (1999) - Ines
Bloody Mallory (2002) - Lady Valentine
All Inclusive (2008) - Carmen
Ilusiones ópticas (2009) - Rita
Faces in the Crowd (2010) - Nina
Night Across the Street (2012) - Nigilda
Johnny 100 Pesos: Capítulo Dos (2017) - María Francisca

Television
Le flair du petit docteur (1 episode, 1986) - Laure
Piazza Navona (1 episode, 1988) - Perla
Air America (1 episode, 1999) - Celia
L'Été de Chloé (2002) - Agnès
Un homme en colère (1 episode, 2002) - Laura
Les Liaisons dangereuses (2003) (mini  series) - Emilie
Le Caprice des cigognes (2006) - Anna
Fête de famille (5 episodes, 2006) - Monica
Héroes (2007) (episode: "Balmaceda") - Sofía Linares

Discography
 Tiger In A Dress (Single, 1992) (Original Title song from the film The Tigress)
 Midnight Dancing (Song, 1994) (vocals, track included in Jon Anderson's album Deseo)
 Mensaje Amazónico (feat. vocals in this song by "Sin Fronteras", included in the album "Kiruba: Alpaka & Sin Fronteras")
 Bit of Sun (Album, 2013)

References

External links

Official Website

1964 births
Living people
Chilean film actresses
People from Santiago